is a Japanese pop singer and former member of the Hello! Project-associated trio v-u-den.

History 
In July 2003, Erika successfully passed the Tsunku♂ Produce Hello! Project Shin Unit Audition. In August 2004, she joined the group called v-u-den with former Morning Musume member Rika Ishikawa and Hello! Project Egg Audition 2004 winner Yui Okada.

In early 2006 she joined the new Hello! Project kickball team Metro Rabbits H.P.

Miyoshi was cast as Kotomi Kanda in the Japanese film Sukeban Deka: Codename = Asamiya Saki, which was released on September 30, 2006.

Appearances

TV shows

Radio

External links 
 Official Hello! Project profile
 

1984 births
Living people
Japanese women pop singers
Musicians from Sapporo
V-u-den members
Japanese female idols
Japanese actresses